Vicky Lau is the head chef of the two-Michelin star restaurant Tate Dining Room in Hong Kong. In 2015, she was named the Best Female Chef in Asia by Asia's 50 Best Restaurants.

Early life
Hong Kong-native Vicky Lau moved to the United States at the age of 15, where she attended a boarding school in Connecticut. She attended New York University, studying graphic communication. Following this she worked in advertising for six years and became the creative director of a design agency. She intended to move back to Hong Kong to work collaboratively with her sister, but felt that she wanted to move into another area of design.

Two friends of her were about to attend a three-month-long basic course at Le Cordon Bleu in Bangkok, Thailand, and so she decided to join them. After finishing that course, she wanted to continue learning and went on to complete the nine-month Grand Diplôme at Le Cordon Bleu Dusit course. She was interested in a move into fine dining cuisine in order to combine her knowledge of design and food together.

Culinary career
She started working at Cépage in Hong Kong under head chef Sebastien Lepinoy, where she worked for 18 months as a chef de cuisine. She opened her restaurant, the 26 seats Tate Dining Room and Bar in 2012, where she served a combination of French and Japanese cuisine which the Michelin Guide describes as an "eclectic mix". Dishes served at the restaurant included a dessert which resembles a zen garden, using sugar as the gravel and Lau hopes that the dish will cause the diner to "reflect and ponder on things at the end of their meal".

TATE Dining Room
In 2012, Vicky Lau opened her first restaurant as an Owner/Chef, TATE Dining Room, which has been awarded 2 Michelin stars. In 2019, TATE Dining Room joined the Relais & Chateaux association.

Awards
Following the opening of Tate Dining Room in 2012, the Michelin Guide awarded it a star in 2013; in 2021 it was elevated to two stars. Lau was named the Best Female Chef in Asia at the 2015 announcement of Asia's 50 Best Restaurants.

References

Living people
Hong Kong people
Hong Kong women
Head chefs of Michelin starred restaurants
Women chefs
Alumni of Le Cordon Bleu
New York University alumni
Year of birth missing (living people)